Narva Offensive may refer to any of the following military operations of the Eastern Front of  World War II: 
 Narva Offensive (15–28 February 1944)
 Narva Offensive (1–4 March 1944)
 Narva Offensive (18–24 March 1944)
 Narva Offensive (July 1944)